Water polo was contested for men only at the 1978 Central American and Caribbean Games in Medellín, Colombia.

References
 

1978 Central American and Caribbean Games
1978
1978 in water polo